Shirah Choqa-ye Chalanchi (also Romanized as Shīrah Choqā-ye Chālānchī; also known as Shīrah Choqā) is a village in Sarab Rural District, in the Central District of Eyvan County, Ilam Province, Iran. At the 2006 census, its population was 76, in 17 families. The village is populated by Kurds.

References 

Populated places in Eyvan County
Kurdish settlements in Ilam Province